Sakarya University Middle East Institute (also known as ORMER) is located on the campus of Sakarya University in Sakarya, Turkey.

History
The idea of Sakarya University Middle East Institute goes back to the year 2005 when the first issue of Middle East Annual (Ortadoğu Yıllığı) was published by a group of academics including the founding director of the institute, Kemal Inat. In the aftermath of the Arab Spring, this idea turned a concrete step with the opening of a master program on the Middle East under the Social Science Institute of Sakarya University in May 2012. At the same year, an online master program on the Middle East was also inaugurated. Those who opened Master-level programs organized the first Middle East Congress on Politics and Society between 9 and 11 October 2012.

After the opening of another Middle East program at PhD level, the Center for Middle Eastern Studies at Sakarya University was established on 11 December 2013. The main focus of the center was the effect of the Arab Spring on politics, society and economy of the Middle East. Accordingly, the second Middle East Congress on Politics and Society was organized in order to deal with effects of the Arab Spring on the Middle East.

According to founding director of the institute, Turkey's need for academically-educated experts on the Middle East became a problem especially after two important political developments in the opening years of the 21st Century, rising interest of Turkey towards the Middle East region, and political turmoil following the Arab Spring. Motivated by these political developments, the center reorganized itself as an institute. Therefore, Sakarya University Middle East Institute was officially established on May 25, 2015, and all graduate programs and staff were transferred to this institute. However, the institute continues to use ORMER as its abbreviation. ORMER is a shortened form of Ortadoğu Merkezi (Middle East Center).

Activities
As part of its mission, Sakarya University Middle East Institute offers a variety of opportunities including conferences, lecture series, workshops, and outreach activities. The institute also publishes booklets, detailed reports, policy briefs, and short commentaries on current affairs of the Middle East.

The main activity of the institute is to organize Middle East Congress on Politics and Society biennially. Prior to the establishment of the institute, this congress was organized firstly by Department of International Relations, Sakarya University in 2012. The second Middle East Congress on Politics and Society was organized by the Center for Middle Eastern Studies at Sakarya University in 2014.

Periodicals
In addition to policy briefs, and short commentaries published in its web page on occasion, Sakarya University Middle East Institute is the editorial home to a peer-review academic journal and a peer-review academic annual, both of which focus particularly on the Middle East.

The Middle East Annual,, published since 2005, covers political, economic and societal developments in each country of the Middle East.

Turkish Journal of Middle Eastern Studies, published since 2014, is a peer-review academic journal.

Current staff
 Director: Tuncay Kardas
 Deputy Director: Yıldırım Turan and Nebi Miş
 Graduate Program Coordinator: Recep Tayyip Gurler

Previous Directors
Kemal Inat (2015 - September 2018)

References

Sakarya University
Middle Eastern studies
Organizations established in 2015
Political research institutes
2015 establishments in Turkey
Organizations based in Sakarya Province
Adapazarı